Takaba is a village and principal settlement of the commune of Soumpou in the Cercle of Yélimané in the Kayes Region of south-western Mali.

References

Populated places in Kayes Region